High Tech Middle Media Arts, often abbreviated to HTMMA, is a public charter middle school located in Point Loma, San Diego. Founded in 2005, it is a part of High Tech High Village. It serves approximately 300 students in grades 6–8. Its curriculum is stemmed from HTH design principles.

History 
Prior to being an elementary, middle and high school, the building in which HTMMA is located in used to be a communication learning facility. It is located in Liberty Station, an old Naval Training Center, now filled with high schools, restaurants, and stores. High Tech Middle Media Arts was built about five years after the original High Tech High.

Overview 
High Tech Middle Media arts is one if the four middle schools in the High Tech High system. It is located on the second floor of the HTHMA building. It is connected to Explorer Elementary, and above it is High Tech High Media Arts. Project based learning is the foundation for its curriculum. HTMMA has implemented the High Tech High designing principles into its curriculum. The school serves approximately 330 students with about 16 teachers.

Intersession 
At HTMMA, there is a program called Intersession. A two-week course that offers many different opportunities for students and teachers. Teachers engage students in a topic that they are passionate about. This can include, but is not limited to, international trips, traveling, drama, service learning, art, sports, dance, photography and so much more!

References

External links

Charter middle schools in California
High Tech High charter schools